Emblemariopsis bahamensis, the blackhead blenny, is a species of chaenopsid blenny found in coral reefs in the western Atlantic ocean. It and can reach a maximum length of  TL.

References
 Stephens, J.S., Jr., 1961 (10 Nov.) A description of a new genus and two new species of chaenopsid blennies from the western Atlantic. Notulae Naturae (Philadelphia) No. 349: 1–8.

bahamensis
Taxa named by John S. Stephens Jr.
Fish described in 1961